The Guangdong–Hainan railway  or Yuehai railway is a railway that operates from Haikou railway station in Hainan, via South Port, a few hundred metres north-west on the coast, and the Qiongzhou Strait ferry, to Zhanjiang, at the tip of the Leizhou Peninsula in Guangdong, and then north into Guangdong.

Yuehai Railway Ferry
The Yuehai Railway Ferry is a train and vehicle ferry connecting the Chinese provinces of Guangdong and Hainan. The ferry service runs across the Qiongzhou Strait, between Zhanjiang and South Port, just north-west of Haikou railway station.

When ferries containing railway cars arrive at South Port from Zhanjiang, passengers not travelling in railway cars disembark. The passenger cars are run off the ferries and a locomotive is attached, which takes the train to the Haikou railway station. There, the passengers exit the cars and leave the station, or they can connect to the Hainan eastern ring high-speed railway. Freight trains also use the ferry service and travel through Haikou railway station onto the Hainan western ring railway, and to other locations in Hainan, such as Dongfang.

The line has operated since January 2003, carrying both freight and passenger trains, enabling direct train service between the mainland and the cities of Haikou and Sanya on Hainan Island. In 2010, two ferry boats were in operation: Yuehai No. 1 and Yuehai No. 2. The third boat, Yuehai No. 3, was launched in Tianjin in September 2010.

Yuehai No. 3 and the fourth boat, Yuehai No. 4, entered revenue service with the  ferry company on February 1, 2013. The two 23,000-ton vessels are 
188 meter long, 23 meters wide and 15.3 meters in total height; they have a 5.6 m draft. The vessels carry rail cars at the lower deck and cars on the upper deck; there are passenger compartments as well. They travel at the speed of up to 17 knots.

Gallery

Notes

External links

Rail transport in Guangdong
Rail transport in Hainan
Train ferries
Ferries of China